Wright House is a historic home located at Newark, New Castle County, Delaware.  It was built in 1922 and is a -story "E"-shaped brick dwelling with a five-bay front facade. It is in the Colonial Revival style.  It features a three bay main portico with fluted Corinthian order columns and a frame porte cochere.  The house was purchased by the University of Delaware after 1950 and serves as the home of the University President.

It was added to the National Register of Historic Places in 1982.

References

University of Delaware
Houses on the National Register of Historic Places in Delaware
Colonial Revival architecture in Delaware
Houses completed in 1922
Houses in Newark, Delaware
National Register of Historic Places in New Castle County, Delaware